IbIn (pronounced as ‘Ib’+’in’) stands for India Backbone Implementation Network. Conceived during the creation of the 12th Five Year Plan, IbIn’s objective is to systematically promote capabilities that ensure coordination, collaboration, and implementation on issues, projects and policy within India. These capabilities include stakeholder alignment, project management, and policy advisory all of which require technical skills (for the process) as well as domain knowledge (pertaining to the specific subject matter or sector) knowledge. Since no single entity can provide all these skills and knowledge, IbIn is designed as a network that will cross-share and cross-link this information by leveraging partner organizations

Background 

India has huge potential but there are many constraints to growth. A study of the root causes for why projects in India “get stuck” highlighted issues like conflicting interests amongst stakeholders, and poor coordination between agencies. As a result, implementation failures exist at many levels –at the centre, in the states, in districts and cities too. Therefore, to address these challenges to implementation, the 12th Five Year Plan recognized the need for a “backbone organization”, which led to the conceptualization of IbIn.

The concept of the IBIN was then developed through extensive discussions within the country of the root causes for coordination and implementation failures and through exploration of methods of coordination and effective implementation adopted by other countries. The concept was then offered for criticism to an international panel of experts in national evolution strategies, consisting of Dani Rodrik and Ricardo Hausmann (Harvard Kennedy School of Public Policy), Charles Sabel (Columbia Law School), Francis Fukuyama (Stanford University) and Mushtaq Khan (London Univ.) IbIn was launched in April 2013 as a Planning Commission initiative under the leadership of Arun Maira and anchored by India@75. The website of IbIn was launched in August 2013.

The 'IbIn Way'
Lack of multi-stakeholder alignment is one of the main reason for poor implementation in a cooperation setup. In a diverse country such as India, this alignment cannot be achieved by either imposing authority or appointing selected ‘experts’ to find a solution that will be imposed on the rest.  An alternative approach would be to encourage all stakeholders to an open exploration towards achieving a common objective. Since such an open and deliberative process could be challenging to manage, the ‘IbIn’ way emphasizes the use of proven and tested processes.

Structure of the IbIn movement 
The movement has been modeled on the Total Quality Management (TQM) of Japan, which revolutionized Japan and made the manufacturing sector in Japan recognizable as an international benchmark for excellence. The IbIn movement has been envisaged as a backbone network structure.

Since IbIn is modeled as a network, it will need some mechanism to disseminate its capabilities. One such mechanism is by establishing ‘nodes’. A node is a structural unit within another larger organization that promotes the use of IbIn processes and capabilities.

Each node aims to bring three types of partners together. The partners either possess technical skills (in which case they are known as ‘enablers’) or the ability to dedicate resources – financial, human, knowledge, (known as ‘sponsors’). The network is also composed of organizations that generate the demand for IbIn capabilities and thus help spread the word (thus known as ‘Channels’).

The IbIn cell is the first node of the IbIn movement. The cell's core group consists of 7-8 professionals under the mentorship of Arun Maira. The IbIn cell is endorsed by the Planning Commission but anchored outside the official government structure at India @ 75.

IbIn activities

Projects 

IbIn cell is facilitating multi-stakeholder engagement over contentious issues like Industrial Relations and Affordable Healthcare.  It is also involved projects that promote good practices like Business regulatory framework for India and Aspiration of elderly healthcare.

Capability building 

IbIn cell is developing an India-centric tool box to develop capabilities in managing cooperation system.

Match-making/Node formation 

Several nodes have also been by the IbIn cell to build specific capabilities in diverse areas:

 PCMD division of Planning Commission: The Planning-Coordinating-Managing division (PCMD) is working on initiatives like Policy coherence, Think tank for policy formulation etc.
 NIESBUD at Ministry of MSME:  The National Institute for entrepreneurship and small business development (NIESBUD) is anchoring cluster stimulation cell for accelerated cluster growth. It is supported by Ministry of MSME.
 Department of Industrial Policy and Promotion (DIPP):  DIPP is anchoring the business regulatory ratings initiative with the support from Planning Commission.  Under this initiative, it would rank all the states in terms of ease of doing business in that state and promote good practices across states for improvement.
 Sakal-Pemandu: PEMANDU and Sakal have inked a 50: 50 JV to launch a joint program in Maharashtra for ‘Deliver Maharashtra’ program. They have already brought on board senior politicians from all parties and have kicked off "planning labs" from early-2014. Other states of India are also exploring application of PEMANDU methodology in their respective states.
 Bangalore Baptist Hospital: The BBH is anchoring an initiative for elderly healthcare.

References

External links 
 http://www.ibinmovement.in
 https://web.archive.org/web/20110716024621/http://planningcommission.nic.in/
 http://www.giz.de/en/
 http://www.worldbank.org/en/country/india
 http://indiaat75.in/

Government programmes of India